Jayden Raymond Fevrier (born 14 April 2003) is an English professional footballer who plays as a right winger for Colchester United.

Club career
Fevrier joined West Ham United at the age of six. At the age of 14, Fevrier made his debut for West Ham's under-18 side. In October 2018, at the age of 15 years, six months and 12 days, Fevrier became the youngest ever player to represent West Ham's reserves, playing against Leicester City. On 30 June 2021, Fevrier signed his first professional contract with West Ham. 

On 5 October 2022, following his release from West Ham, Fevrier signed for EFL League Two side Colchester United. On 29 December 2022, Fevrier made his debut for Colchester, coming on as a late substitute in a 2–1 loss against AFC Wimbledon.

International career
Fevrier has represented England at youth level.

Honours

Individual
West Ham United Dylan Tombides Award: 2020–21

References

Living people
2003 births
Footballers from the London Borough of Waltham Forest
English footballers
Association football defenders
Association football wingers
Black British sportspeople
West Ham United F.C. players
Colchester United F.C. players
English Football League players